Neelam Ibrar Chattan (born 1994) is a Pakistani campaigner for human rights. She won the European Union - Paiman Trust Gold Award for her work. She educates for children's rights and human rights in the war-torn Swat Valley, Pakistan. She shares her hometown with Malala Yousafzai.

References

1994 births
Living people
Pakistani human rights activists